Robert McGregor was a Scottish footballer who played professionally in Scotland and the American Soccer League.

McGregor played for Morton from 1919 to 1923, winning the 1922 Scottish Cup with them. In 1923, he left Scotland to join Bethlehem Steel in the American Soccer League.  He played for Bethlehem until 1930, serving as team captain during the last few years with the team.  During his time with Bethlehem Steel, the team won the 1924 American Cup, 1926 National Challenge Cup, two league titles and one league cup.  In 1930, McGregor moved to the Newark Americans for at least one season.

External links

References

American Soccer League (1921–1933) players
Bethlehem Steel F.C. (1907–1930) players
Scottish Football League players
Scottish Junior Football Association players
Pollok F.C. players
Greenock Morton F.C. players
Newark Americans players
Scottish footballers
Footballers from Glasgow
Scottish expatriate footballers
Association football wing halves
Scottish expatriate sportspeople in the United States
Expatriate soccer players in the United States
Year of birth missing